Gerard Gramse (18 August 1944 –  8 November 2012) was a Polish sprinter who specialized in the 100 and 200 metres.

He was born in Mrocza and represented the club AZS Poznań. At the 1971 European Championships he won a silver medal in the 4 x 100 metres relay together with Marian Dudziak, Tadeusz Cuch and Zenon Nowosz. He also won a gold medal in the same event at the 1970 Summer Universiade, together with Stanisław Wagner, Jan Werner and Zenon Nowosz.

His personal best times were 10.3 seconds in the 100 metres and 21.0 seconds in the 200 metres.

References

1944 births
2012 deaths
Polish male sprinters
People from Nakło County
European Athletics Championships medalists
Sportspeople from Kuyavian-Pomeranian Voivodeship
Universiade medalists in athletics (track and field)
Universiade gold medalists for Poland
Medalists at the 1970 Summer Universiade
20th-century Polish people